This is the discography of Serbian and former Yugoslav rock band Galija. This discography consists of 13 studio albums, 1 live album, 2 7-inch singles, and 5 compilation albums. This list does not include solo material or side projects performed by the members.

Studio albums

Live albums

Compilation albums

Singles

Books
Galija, Milan Kerković (1995)

External links
The official Galija discography

Discographies of Serbian artists
Rock music group discographies